"The Hateful Eight-Year-Olds" is the 21st and penultimate episode of the thirty-first season of the American animated television series The Simpsons, and the 683rd episode overall. It aired in the United States on Fox on May 10, 2020. The episode was written by Joel H. Cohen and was directed by Jennifer Moller.

Plot
Lisa is invited to the birthday party of Addy Lancer, a girl Lisa bonded with over a mutual love of books and horses. Bart makes fun of Lisa's love of horses, and because of this she symbolically severs their sibling relationship. Addy turns out to be quite wealthy, with horses of her own. Her friends, however, are cruel and cliquish, and quickly begin to bully Lisa, but Addy refuses to join in. Addy excuses herself to the bathroom to talk to Lisa, and tearfully admits that she invited her so that the girls would have someone besides her to make fun of, like they have been doing for years. Lisa gives her a hug and says that if Addy's friends bully her all the time, then they were not her friends to begin with.

Unable to contact her parents who are on a sunset cruise, Lisa calls Bart for help. Bart arrives, but insists that Lisa get revenge on the girls by mutilating their hair as they sleep. Caught in the act, Addy comes to Lisa's rescue by taking the blame, allowing her and Bart to escape. She symbolically severs her friendships with the girls, saying that she can be just as cruel as they are, which they respect.

Meanwhile, Homer takes Marge on a booze cruise. After getting in a fight with the band's singer who he thinks is hitting on Marge, Homer nearly ruins the trip. He reminds the crowd that leaving the house is hardly a pleasure for middle-aged people, and the passengers are inclined to agree.

Reception
Tony Sokol of Den of Geek gave this episode a 4 out of 5 stars, stating “The episode works because everything in the end is Simpsonized. The family character prevails in all social situations. Lisa doesn’t only remind her friend Addy of the important things in life. She inspires her to ditch her overinflated fake friends, which lead them to want to be real friends with her. Homer gets to give a rousing speech, not only to save his and Marge’s lives, but also to prod the people around him to be better people, to stay home and watch TV. ‘The Hateful Eight-Year-Olds’ is loaded with message, but also has its share of laughs.”

References

External links
 

The Simpsons (season 31) episodes
2020 American television episodes
Television episodes about bullying